Kugan may refer to:
Kugan, Isfahan
Kugan Baraftab, Lorestan Province
Kugan Nasar, Lorestan Province